1493: Uncovering the New World Columbus Created is a nonfiction book by Charles C. Mann first published in 2011.  It covers the global effects of the Columbian Exchange, following Columbus first landing in the Americas, that led to our current globalized world civilization. It follows on from Mann's previous book on the Americas prior to Columbus, 1491: New Revelations of the Americas Before Columbus.

In his book, Mann argues that Columbus paved the way to the homogenocene, a particular feature of the anthropocene that is marked by a global homogenization of (agricultural) species, diseases, and tools brought about by the migration and transport that set in with the discovery of the new world. Modern global food production largely relies on “invasive species” (crops, livestock) that existed only regionally before establishment of the new trade and transport paths.

Different titles 
In the United Kingdom, the book is published by Granta Books and is titled 1493: How the Ecological Collision of Europe and the Americas Gave Rise to the Modern World.

The book was adapted for younger readers by Rebecca Stefoff and published by Seven Stories Press in 2015 as 1493 for Young People: From Columbus's Voyage to Globalization.

Reception
Ian Morris, in his review in The New York Times, appreciates the interesting tales Mann tells, writing: “He makes even the most unpromising-sounding subjects fascinating. I, for one, will never look at a piece of rubber in quite the same way now that I have been introduced to the debauched nouveaux riches of 19th-century Brazil, guzzling Champagne from bathtubs and gunning one another down in the streets of Manaus.” Gregory McNamee in The Washington Post finds 1493 “fascinating and complex, exemplary in its union of meaningful fact with good storytelling.”

See also
 1491: New Revelations of the Americas Before Columbus
 Indian Givers: How the Indians of the Americas Transformed the World

References

Christopher Columbus
History books about the Americas
2011 non-fiction books
History of indigenous peoples of North America
Non-fiction books about indigenous peoples of the Americas
Alfred A. Knopf books